The capture of Roxburgh was a siege that took place during the Anglo-Scottish Wars. James II of Scotland had started a campaign to recapture Roxburgh and Berwick from the English, while the rulers of England were occupied with the Wars of the Roses. King James would die during the siege being blown up by a cannon.

Background 
Following the Wars of Scottish Independence a century earlier, Roxburgh was one of the last castles in Scotland still to be held by the English. By 1460, England was in the middle of civil war, the Wars of the Roses, and it would seem that both sides had requested the aid of King James in this struggle, with James intending to use the opportunity to take back both Roxburgh and Berwick for Scotland.

Prior to the attack on Roxburgh, the English had believed that Berwick was the target, and were thus outmaneuvered.

Siege 
King James and his army first arrived at Roxburgh in July, first taking and demolishing the English dominated town. When the castle refused to surrender, James began the siege.

On the 3rd August the James was standing close to one of his cannons when he ordered it to be fired. The cannon exploded, mortally wounding him.

Following his death, James' queen, Mary of Guelders, ordered the army to continue the siege. The castle would surrender on the 5th August, with the defenders allowed to depart and no prisoners being taken.

Aftermath 

Following the siege the castle was destroyed (slighted) so it could not be used by the English again.

With the death of the King, Mary of Guelders and Bishop James Kennedy ruled as regents until James III of Scotland was old enough to rule. During this time, Mary would prove an able diplomat, gaining Berwick in return for supplying aid to the Lancastrians.

References

1460 in England
1460 in Scotland
Roxburgh
Roxburgh
Roxburgh
15th-century military history of Scotland